The Giardino Botanico Alpinia (4 hectares) is a botanical garden specializing in alpine plants, located at 800 m altitude above Stresa on Lake Maggiore, Province of Verbano-Cusio-Ossola, Piedmont, Italy. It can be reached via the Lido di Carciano - Alpino - Mottarone cable car, and is open daily in the warmer months.

The garden was established in 1934 with the name Duxia. Today it contains about 1,000 species, focusing mainly on the Alps and foothills, with additional specimens from the Caucasus, China, and Japan. Its collections include:
Artemisia (A. atrata, A. borealis, A. campestris, A. chamaemelifolia, A. genipi, A. Umbelliformis, A. vallesiaca)
Campanula (C. bononiensis, C. excisa, C. glomerata, C. spicata, C. thyrsoides)
Centaurea (C. bracteata, C. cyanus, C. Montana, C. phrygia, C. scabiosa, C. triumfetti), 
Dianthus (D. alpinus, D. carthusianorum, D. seguieri, D. sylvestris)
Geranium (G. argenteum, G. macrorrhizum, G. phaeum, G. pratense, G. sanguineum, G. sylvaticum)
Silene (S. alpestris, S. dioica, S. rupestris, S. saxifraga, S. vallesia).

Additional species are displayed on nearby walks. The garden's nature walk displays 
Acer pseudoplatanus
Arundo donax
Betula pubescens
Cytisus scoparius
Fagus sylvatica
Frangula alnus
Fraxinus excelsior
Juniperus communis
Laburnum anagyroides
Lythrum salicaria
Sorbus aria
S. aucuparia
Iris pseudacorus
I. sibirica
Myosotis scorpioides
Salix sp.
Scirpus sylvaticus
Silphium perfoliatum
Typha latifolia
The trail from Stresa to the Mottarone passes by:
Androsace vandellii
Campanula glomerata
Gentiana asclepiadea
G. kochiana
G. purpurea
Hypochoeris uniflora
Narcissus poeticus
Primula hirsuta
Rhododendron ferrugineum
Trollius europaeus
Veratrum album.

See also 
 List of botanical gardens in Italy

References 
 Giardino Botanico Alpinia
 Touring Club Italiano, L'Italia dei giardini, Touring Editore, 2005, pages 18–19. .

Botanical gardens in Italy
Province of Verbano-Cusio-Ossola
Gardens in Piedmont
Tourist attractions in Piedmont
Stresa